The Tour d'Annaba was a stage race held in 2015 and 2016 in Algeria, which was rated 2.2 and part of the UCI Africa Tour. Hichem Chaabane won the race in 2015 but was stripped of the title after testing positive for a banned substance in April of that year.

Winners

References

Cycle races in Algeria
2015 establishments in Algeria
Recurring sporting events established in 2015
2016 disestablishments in Algeria
Recurring sporting events disestablished in 2016
UCI Africa Tour races